Henry Poor may refer to:
 Henry Varnum Poor (1812–1905), American financial analyst
 Henry Varnum Poor (designer) (1888–1970), American artist and designer
 Henry William Poor (1844–1915), American banker and stockbroker, son of financial analyst Henry Varnum Poor
 Henry Varnum Poor (Yale dean) (1914–1972), American politician and associate law school dean at Yale Law School

See also
 Henry Rankin Poore (1859–1940), American painter and illustrator